Rab C. Nesbitt is a British television sitcom, created by Ian Pattison, and produced by BBC Scotland. It originally premiering with a Christmas special, broadcast on BBC1, before being transmitted on BBC2. The series, set in Govan, Glasgow, follows Rab C. Nesbitt (Gregor Fisher), an alcoholic who strives to maintain an unemployed lifestyle.

Series overview

Episodes

Christmas Special (1988)

Series 1 (1990–91)
The episode "Fitba" was recorded in 1990 along with the main block of episodes broadcast that year, but was held over until the summer of 1991 outside Scotland. The broadcast order has often been disputed, with some sources claiming "Holiday" was broadcast as episode 3 and "City of Culture" as episode 6; however, the official DVD release lists the episodes in the following order.

Live Special (1992)

Series 2 (1992)
The episodes "Lesson" and "Home" are both extended episodes and run for forty-five minutes. A number of memorable one-time characters appeared in this season; it was in this season that David McKay made his first appearance in the show as the son of Jimbo McGurn, before landing the role of Screech in 1994 and making his first appearance in "Love".

Series 3 (1993)
Series three is the last series to feature Burney Nesbitt (Eric Cullen), who departs after the episode "Right", as none of the Nesbitt family feature in the episode "Cell" aside from Rab himself. This series also featured the last appearance of Sara Corper as Pheobe, as she was replaced by Sarah Crowden in the role in future appearances.

Series 4 (1994)
Series four saw the introduction of Screech Nesbitt (David McKay) who replaced outgoing character Burney Nesbitt (Eric Cullen). The series also sees the introduction of Isa Nesbitt (Anna Welsh), Rab's mother, who is introduced in episode one but dies in episode two. Series four featured the first two-part story to feature in the show's run, "Love" and "Mother".

Series 5 (1996)
Filming on series five began in 1995, but was not broadcast until 1996; meaning that the show took a year's break and 1995 was the first year that a new episode of Rab C. Nesbitt was not broadcast. Guest stars in this series include Sylvester McCoy, who plays the role of Gash Sr., Rab's long lost older brother who comes to live with him.

Series 6 (1997)
The sixth series of the show was the last to feature David McKay's character Screech, who was written out of the show following McKay's decision to leave. McKay becomes only the second main cast member to depart the series at this point, with Eric Cullen having left the show following the third series in 1993. "Growth" and "Semmitry" become the show's second two-part story.

Series 7 (1998)
The seventh series introduces Gash's new girlfriend, Bridie (Nicola Park), as a replacement for the outgoing Screech (David McKay), who departed after series six. The series touches on a range of topical subjects, including a new government coming into power, prescription drugs and mugging, none of which the series had discussed before.

Series 8 (1999)
Series eight follows on directly from where series seven left off, and was the last regular series to be broadcast before the show's revival in 2008. This series was the second series to feature Bridie (Nicola Park), who later reprises her role for the 2010 series. The character of Tweety is also portrayed by a different actor, following Ian Bustard's departure from the role.

Christmas Special (2008)

Series 9 (2010)
The ninth series is the only series not to feature Dodie (Iain McColl), who was unavailable for filming. The character of Peaches is introduced into the series, and following Andrew Fairlie's decision not to reprise the role of Gash, Iain Robertson is recast in the role. Nicola Park reprises her role as Bridie, the mother of Gash's only daughter.

Series 10 (2011)
Series ten is the final regular series to be broadcast to date. Series ten saw the return of Dodie (Iain McColl) in a very minor role, while Gash, Gash's daughter Peaches and ex-girlfriend Bridie all appear in very minor roles. This series features a number of guest appearances, including Richard E. Grant, Shane MacGowan, John Sergeant, Susan Boyle and Hamish Clark.

New Year Special (2014)

References

External links
  Comedy Guide
 Rab C. Nesbitt at Phill.co.uk
 Rab C. Nesbitt at British Film Institute Screen
 Rab C. Nesbitt at The Comedy Unit
 

Lists of British sitcom episodes